Josh Heald (born December 12, 1977) is an American screenwriter, director, and producer best known for his work on Cobra Kai and Hot Tub Time Machine.

Early life 
Heald was born in Red Bank, New Jersey. He was raised in Middletown Township, New Jersey and attended Middletown High School South, where he played the trombone and was a drum major in the school's marching band.

Heald was studying finance at the University of Pennsylvania's Wharton School, with Jon Hurwitz who lived in the same dorm with him during freshman year.  As Hurwitz's high school friend Hayden Schlossberg (who was in college at The University of Chicago) frequently came to visit, Heald also got to know him as well.

Career
During his time at Wharton, Heald was the  editor-in-chief of 34th Street magazine, and he briefly considered a career in journalism. Ultimately, he accepted a position in finance, but was laid off during the Dot-com bust in 2001. He then joined Hurwitz and Schlossberg in Los Angeles, where he worked as a screenwriter.

Heald currently works on Cobra Kai, a continuation of The Karate Kid franchise with Hurwitz & Schlossberg. The trio serve as executive producers, show runners, writers, and directors on the series. More recently they all signed a deal with Sony Pictures Television.

Filmography

See also
Jon Hurwitz
Hayden Schlossberg

References

External links 

 

1977 births
Living people
American male screenwriters
Middletown High School South alumni

People from Middletown Township, New Jersey
People from Red Bank, New Jersey
Wharton School of the University of Pennsylvania alumni
Screenwriters from New Jersey